Osmotritelny was a  of the Soviet and later Russian navy.

Development and design 

The project began in the late 1960s when it was becoming obvious to the Soviet Navy that naval guns still had an important role particularly in support of amphibious landings, but existing gun cruisers and destroyers were showing their age. A new design was started, employing a new 130 mm automatic gun turret.

Construction and career 
Osmotritelny was laid down on 22 April 1978 and launched on 21 March 1981 by Zhdanov Shipyard in Leningrad.   She was commissioned on 30 September 1983.

On August 14, 1991, she was delivered for repairs to Dalzavod, part of the 79th Brigade of Ships under construction and being repaired, but almost no repairs were carried out.

As a result, on August 16, 1997, the ship was excluded from the lists of the fleet.

On July 18, 1998, she was taken to Strelok Bay for dismantling.

References 

1982 ships
Ships built at Severnaya Verf
Cold War destroyers of the Soviet Union
Sovremenny-class destroyers